A graded reader book is an "easy reading" book that supports the extensive reading approach to teaching English as a second or foreign language, and other languages. While many graded reader books are written for native speaker children, more often they are targeted at young adults and above, since children's books are already widely available and deal with topics not relevant to more mature language learners.

Graded readers can be adapted from literary classics, films, biographies, travel books, etc., or they can be original works written at a less demanding language level. Although they employ simplified language, graded readers do not necessarily lack narrative depth or avoid complex themes; often, they cover the same range of "serious" themes as books written for native speaker audiences.

Graded readers are written with specific levels of grammatical complexity in mind and with vocabulary that is limited by frequency headword counts. For example, Level 1 in a series might be restricted to 500 headwords, Level 2 to 600 headwords, and Level 3 to 700 headwords. Simple English Wikipedia is designed along similar lines. Other factors are taken into consideration when selecting titles to publish, or determining levels, might include the number and range of characters; the complexity of the plot; the expected background of the target audience; compliance requirements for certain markets (regarding e.g., sex, dating, religion, gender roles and sexuality, etc.), among other factors.

Graded readers are not to be confused with Basal readers, such as Dick and Jane, which tend to target specific language features, and therefore are more like textbooks in nature.

References

Further reading

External links 

 Black Cat CIDEB
 Cambridge English Readers
 Easy Readers
 ELI Graded Readers
 I Talk You Talk Press
 Ladybird
 Macmillan Guided Readers
 Matatabi Graded Readers
 Oxford Graded Readers
 Pearson Readers
 Penguin Readers
 Scholastic Readers
 Wayzgoose Press

Language acquisition
English as a second or foreign language
Reading (process)